Landry Chauvin (born 7 December 1968) is a French former footballer who most recently was the manager of Tunisian team Club Africain.

Chauvin spent his playing career in the semi-professional leagues. He made six appearances in two seasons with Laval B between 1985 and 1987, and then spent three years with Vitré.

In 1992, he joined the coaching staff at Rennes, where he stayed for 16 seasons. Chauvin was appointed as manager of Sedan on 27 May 2008, and signed a contract extension the following year. On 1 June 2011, after three years with Sedan, Chauvin was hired as the manager of Nantes on a two-year deal. On 31 May 2012, Chauvin was appointed as the head coach of Brest after resigning from Nantes. In January 2014, he became the manager of the Tunisian team Club Africain but lasted just five weeks before being fired.

References

1968 births
Living people
People from Château-Gontier
Sportspeople from Mayenne
French footballers
Association football midfielders
Stade Lavallois players
AS Vitré players
French football managers
CS Sedan Ardennes managers
FC Nantes managers
Stade Brestois 29 managers
Club Africain football managers
French expatriate football managers
French expatriate sportspeople in Tunisia
Expatriate football managers in Tunisia
Footballers from Pays de la Loire